Walter Bar (born 5 July 1938) is a Swiss fencer. He competed in the individual and team épée events at the 1964 Summer Olympics.

References

1938 births
Living people
Swiss male fencers
Olympic fencers of Switzerland
Fencers at the 1964 Summer Olympics